Sean Sexton Cunningham (born December 1941) is an American filmmaker, director, producer, and writer. He is best known for directing and producing several horror films, beginning in the early 1970s.

Raised in Connecticut, Cunningham graduated from Franklin & Marshall College before earning an MFA from Stanford University. After completing his education, he worked as a manager for various theater companies, including New York City's Lincoln Center and the Oregon Shakespeare Festival. While working for a documentary company in New York, Cunningham made his feature film directorial debut with The Art of Marriage (1970). While editing his second film, he met Wes Craven, with whom he collaborated as a producer of Craven's exploitation horror film The Last House on the Left (1972).

Cunningham went on to co-create and direct the slasher film Friday the 13th (1980), which was a major box-office success. He produced several horror films throughout the 1980s, including House (1986) and its sequel House II: The Second Story (1988).

Early life
Cunningham was born in New York City and raised in Connecticut. He graduated with a Bachelor of Arts degree from Franklin & Marshall College and later earned an MFA from Stanford University.

Career
Cunningham's first jobs after graduating from Stanford included managing theater companies such as New York's Lincoln Center, the Mineola Theater on Long Island, as well as the Oregon Shakespeare Festival, the latter of where he briefly studied. He is a member of the Academy of Motion Picture Arts and Sciences and the Directors Guild of America.

While working for a documentary company in New York City in the late 1960s, Cunningham made his directorial debut with The Art of Marriage (1970). While editing Together, he met Wes Craven, who was working as an editor at the time. The two collaborated on Craven's directorial debut, the exploitation film The Last House on the Left (1972), which Cunningham produced.

Cunningham is best known for his involvement of multiple films in the Friday the 13th franchise, which introduced the fictional mass murderer Jason Voorhees. Of the 12 films in the series, the ones that had Cunningham's involvement were the original, Jason Goes to Hell: The Final Friday, Jason X, Freddy vs. Jason, and the 2009 reboot. He has also produced many horror films, such as the House series and Wes Craven's debut feature, The Last House on the Left. He is the founder and CEO of Crystal Lake Entertainment. Cunningham was set to produce the CW series adaption of Friday the 13th before that project fell through, and served as a producer of Friday the 13th: The Game.

As of 2015, he is also a member of the board of advisers for the Hollywood Horror Museum.

Filmography

Producer

Director
The Art of Marriage (1970)
Together (1971)
Case of the Full Moon Murders (1973)
Here Come the Tigers (1978)
Manny's Orphans (1978)
Friday the 13th (1980)
A Stranger Is Watching (1982)
Spring Break (1983)
The New Kids (1985)
DeepStar Six (1989)
XCU: Extreme Close Up (2001)
Terminal Invasion (2002)
Trapped Ashes (2006)
The 'Thing''' (short - 2015)The Nurse with the Purple Hair (2017)The Music Teacher (short - 2019)

WriterThe Art of Marriage (1970)Together (1971)Reiselust (1986)The Music Teacher'' (short - 2019)

Notes

References

Works cited

External links

 

1941 births
Living people
American chief executives
Film directors from Connecticut
Film directors from New York City
Horror film directors
Franklin & Marshall College
Stanford University alumni
People from Connecticut